Kaan Taşaner (born 23 April 1979) is a Turkish actor. He began his career in theater, but is most famous for his roles in Turkish television series, including Fatmagül'ün Suçu Ne? (Erdoğan Yaşaran), Kuzey Güney  (Şeref Komiser), Kayip (Kemal Özdemir), and Diriliş: Ertuğrul  (Gündoğdu). Rengarenk (Can)

Life and career

Education
Kaan did not always know that he wanted to be an actor. He was undecided about his career as a teenager, but decided he might like to be on stage after seeing Danton's Death with Reha Özcan. He began training at 17 with the Antalya Metropolitan Municipality Theater Workshop, then continued at the Selçuk University Dilek Sabancı Conservatory in Konya. He is listed as a graduate for the 2002–2003 academic year.

Television 

Kaan has been performing in Turkish television dramas since 2004. Two series in which he has played major roles, Fatmagül'ün Suçu Ne? and Diriliş: Ertuğrul,  have received significant international attention. He commented on the international interest in Turkish productions during a July 2020 interview:Translation:
"We have Hollywood in English; I do not know what the equivalent will be, but I think we have the power to turn it [Turkish TV] into a brand. Yes, our works should be sold, but I strongly believe that we should make art in our native language. This includes television."  Before joining Uyanis: Büyük Selcuklu as Markus, Kaan had not been seen in a series for a year and a half. Although he had offers, he had not found a role he felt comfortable accepting, and articulated some observations on the current male TV roles:Translation:

"Especially this season, I find the positioning of men in the TV series very sexist. That is why I continue to read because I feel a bit responsible in this regard, prefer to avoid such things and be in a more balanced job." During the same interview, he expressed interest in the opportunity to perform a role for the first time.

Music 
Kaan's first song, Bu Bir Oyun (This is a Game), was released on Amazon on 22 November 2020. A music video as well as a video discussing the project were released on 12 December 2020.

Personal life
Kaan's mother, is an actress. She developed an interest in acting after Kaan began his training. Kaan was in a four-year relationship with actress Şelin Sekerci, who was his co-star in Rengarenk. He left the series after their separation.

Theatre

Filmography

Television

Awards

References

External links
 
Kaan Taşaner on YouTube

1979 births
Living people
Turkish male television actors
People from Antalya